The Kayah State Nationalities League for Democracy (KSNLD) was a political party in Myanmar.

History
Following the reintroduction of multi-party democracy after the 8888 Uprising, the party contested eight seats in the 1990 general elections. It received 0.09% of the vote, winning two seats; U Khin Maung Cho in Dimawhso 1 and U Victor Lay in Dinawhso 2, both in Kayah State.

The party was banned by the military government on 18 March 1992.

References

Defunct political parties in Myanmar
1992 disestablishments in Myanmar
Political parties disestablished in 1992